General Sir Thomas Sheridan Riddell-Webster  (12 February 1886 – 27 May 1974) was Quartermaster-General to the Forces during the Second World War.

Military career
Educated at Harrow School and the Royal Military Academy, Woolwich, Riddell-Webster was commissioned as a second lieutenant into the Cameronians (Scottish Rifles) on 16 August 1905. He was promoted to lieutenant on 30 September 1909 and to captain on 24 October 1913.

He served in World War I initially as a staff captain (appointed 3 November 1914) then as deputy assistant adjutant and quartermaster general in France (17 July 1915). He was brevetted to major on 1 January 1916. On 9 July 1917, he was appointed assistant adjutant and quartermaster general in France and Italy, with the temporary rank of lieutenant-colonel.

After the war, Riddell-Webster relinquished his temporary rank of lieutenant-colonel on 1 April 1919. He was promoted to the substantive rank of major and the brevet rank of lieutenant-colonel on 3 June 1919. He became a Brigade Major with Irish Command on 21 July 1921. He was appointed Deputy Assistant Quartermaster General at the Staff College in 1922, and was brevetted to lieutenant-colonel on 12 March 1923. After attending the Staff College, Camberley from 1924 to 1925, he was appointed as a General Staff Officer at Scottish Command in 1926. In 1930 he was made Commanding Officer of 2nd Bn Cameronians, and promoted to substantive lieutenant-colonel on 16 December of that year. He was promoted to colonel on 27 June 1933, became Assistant Quartermaster General at the War Office that year and became Commander Poona (Independent) Brigade Area in 1935.

Riddell-Webster was promoted to major-general on 1 April 1938, becoming the Director of Movements and Quartering at the War Office. He also served in World War II, initially as Deputy Quartermaster General at the War Office (from 29 August 1939) and then as General Officer Commanding-in-Chief Southern Command, India in March 1941. He received the local rank of lieutenant-general on 7 January 1941, and was promoted to the substantive rank on 15 April. He was made Lieutenant General in charge of Administration in the Middle East in 1941.

He became Quartermaster-General to the Forces in 1942: he had a key role in establishing a ground supply route to China from Assam through Burma: the rehabilitation of occupied and liberated territories was a key issue at the time. He was promoted to full general on 1 November 1942. He also extended the use of collars and ties to the uniforms of other ranks. He retired on 27 April 1946, after nearly 41 years of service.

In 1946 he was given the colonelcy of the Cameronians, a position he held until 1951.

Honours
Riddell-Webster was awarded the DSO on 18 February 1915. On 12 September 1918, he was decorated as an Officer of the Order of the Crown of Italy. He was awarded the French Croix de Guerre on 19 June 1919. He was appointed a Companion of the Order of the Bath, Military Division (CB) in the 1939 Birthday Honours, knighted as a Knight Commander (KCB) in the 1942 New Year Honours and promoted to Knight Grand Cross (GCB) in the 1946 New Year Honours. He was decorated as a Commander of the US Legion of Merit on 14 May 1948.

References

Bibliography

External links

Generals of World War II

 

|-
 

1886 births
1974 deaths
People educated at Harrow School
British Army generals of World War II
Knights Grand Cross of the Order of the Bath
Companions of the Distinguished Service Order
Cameronians officers
British Army personnel of World War I
War Office personnel in World War II
Graduates of the Staff College, Camberley
Graduates of the Royal College of Defence Studies
Academics of the Staff College, Camberley